One World Trade Center is a 27-story office building located in Long Beach, California. The 20-story Hilton Long Beach is part of the complex and known as Two World Trade Center. There is a helipad located on top of the building known as the World Trade Center Heliport (FAA: 3CL3).

Location 
One World Trade Center is on Ocean Blvd. It is in the western part of the Long Beach skyline. It is located 20 miles south of downtown Los Angeles.

Gallery

See also
List of tallest buildings in Long Beach

References

External links
World Trade Center Association Los Angeles-Long Beach website

World Trade Centers
Skyscrapers in Long Beach, California
Skyscraper office buildings in California
Office buildings completed in 1989